The Billie Awards was an American awards ceremony that focused on positive portrayals of female athletes in visual media.
It was held in Los Angeles, California by Billie Jean King's The Women's Sports Foundation from 2006-2009.

Awards

2009 Billie Awards
Winners
Breakthrough and Innovation: “Here I Am” – Nike, Advertising Campaign
Industry Leader: Dick Ebersol
Journalism: Mighty Macs – ESPN SportsCenter, Produced by Drew Gallagher; Sync or Swim – Produced by Cheryl Furjanic and Amanda Keropian; The Great Swim – Walker & Company, by Gavin Mortimer

2008 Billie Awards
Nominations for the third annual Billie Awards included Women in American Horse Racing and Generation IX in the Entertainment category.

Winners
Entertainment: Chak De! India  
Journalism: Marathon Woman: Running the Race to Revolutionize Women's Sports
Breakthrough and Innovation: Boom Boom Tap
Outstanding Journalist: Lesley Visser

2007 Billie Awards
Nominations for the second annual Billie Awards included Watermarks (film) and Billie Jean King: Portrait of a Pioneer in the Entertainment category.

Winners
Entertainment: The Heart of the Game
Journalism: Lady Caliphs by ESPN
Breakthrough and Innovation: MADE, MTV Networks
Industry Leader: Ross Greenberg

2006 Billie Awards
Nominations for the first annual Billie Awards included Bend It Like Beckham and Million Dollar Baby in the Entertainment category.

Winners
Entertainment: Dare to Dream: The Story of the U.S. Women's Soccer Team
Journalism: Christine Brennan - USA Today
Breakthrough and Innovation: Game Face: What Does a Female Athlete Look Like?
Industry Leader: Bud Greenspan – Cappy Productions

Notes

External links

Women's Sports Foundation Presents "The Billies" - Backstage - Getty Images
In Second Year, Billie Awards Go Green
Billie Jean King Awards draw sports stars, celebs

American journalism awards
Women's sports
Sports film awards
Women's Sports Foundation